The 2010–11 FC Karpaty Lviv season was the 48th season in club history.

Review and events
On 2 June 2010 FC Karpaty gathered at club's base for medical inspection after vacations. The club went to two-week training camp in Austria on 21 June 2010 with three friendly matches scheduled.

Friendly matches

Pre-season

Mid-season

Winter break

Mid-season 2

Premier League

League table

Results summary

Matches

Ukrainian Cup

UEFA Europa League

Qualifying rounds

Group stage

Squad information

Squad and statistics

Squad, appearances and goals

|-
|colspan="16"|Players away from the club on loan:

|-
|colspan="16"|Players featured for Karpaty but left before the end of the season:

|}

Goalscorers

Disciplinary record

Transfers

In

Out

Sources

Karpaty Lviv
FC Karpaty Lviv seasons